Sociedad Deportiva Ponferradina B is a Spanish football team based in Ponferrada, in the El Bierzo region, León, in the autonomous community of Castile and León. Founded in 1963 as Club de Fútbol Endesa de Ponferrada, it is the reserve team of SD Ponferradina and currently plays in Tercera Federación – Group 8, holding home games at Estadio Compostilla, which holds 6,000 spectators.

History
Founded in 1963 as CF Endesa de Ponferrada, the club played in ten Tercera División seasons before merging into the structure of SD Ponferradina and subsequently changing their name to SD Ponferradina B. On 25 April 2013, Ponferradina announced the removal of its reserve team, Ponferradina B, due to running's high costs. At the same time, signed a three-year affiliate agreement with CD Flores del Sil.

However, the agreement with Flores de Sil only lasted one season, and Ponferradina B returned to an active status in 2014.

Season to season
As CF Endesa de Ponferrada

As SD Ponferradina B

 14 seasons in Tercera División
 1 seasons in Tercera Federación

Current squad
.

Notable former players
 David Mitogo
 Juan Manuel Fuentes

See also
SD Ponferradina

References

External links
Official website 
Futbolme team profile 

Football clubs in Ponferrada
B
Spanish reserve football teams
1963 establishments in Spain
Association football clubs established in 1963
Association football clubs disestablished in 2013
2013 disestablishments in Spain